Irene Cheng (October 21, 1904 – February 17, 2007) was a Hong Kong educationalist. The first Chinese woman to graduate from the University of Hong Kong, she went on to become the highest-ranking woman in the city's Education Department. Throughout her career, she also worked as an educator in mainland China and in the United States.

Early life and education 
Irene Cheng was born Irene Hotung in 1904. She was the daughter of very wealthy Eurasian parents in Hong Kong. Her father, Robert Hotung, was a businessman and philanthropist known as the "grand old man of Hong Kong." Her mother was Hotung's second "co-equal" wife, Clara Hotung. Hers was the first non-white family to live in Hong Kong's elite Victoria Peak neighborhood. 

After studying at the Diocesan Girls' School, in 1921 Irene became one of the first women admitted to the University of Hong Kong. In 1925, she became the first Chinese woman to graduate from the university, earning a degree in English.

She then traveled to Britain to attend King's College London, but her education there was cut short due to family responsibilities; however, she eventually completed a master's in education at Columbia University's Teachers College in 1929. She later attended the University of London, where she obtained a Ph.D. in 1936. In between, she returned to China in the early 1930s to teach at Lingnan University in Guangzhou.

Career 
Throughout her career, Irene Cheng focused her efforts on education, including special education, in both China and the United States. She was a strong proponent of bilingual education.

After obtaining her Ph.D., she returned to China in 1937, serving on the staff of the Ministry of Education in Nanjing. In 1940, she married an engineer from Beijing, Cheng Hsiang-hsien, and they had one child together, a daughter named June. However, less than two years into their marriage, her husband died and she became a young widow. She never remarried, as was customary, but she also would later express that she felt she had no time for a husband.

In 1948 she returned to Hong Kong, where she began working at the city's Education Department, becoming the highest-ranking female staff member there. She also served on the executive board of the World Federation for Mental Health from 1956 to 1959.

Cheng retired from her position in the Education Department in 1961. For her service as an education officer, she was named an Officer of the Order of the British Empire that year. For a few years after her retirement from government, she served as principal of the Confucian Tai Shing School in Hong Kong's Wong Tai Sin. Then she moved to the San Diego area, near where her daughter and other relatives where living, in 1967.

Cheng wrote two memoirs chronicling her experiences in British Hong Kong: "Clara Ho Tung. A Hong Kong Lady: Her Family and Her Times" (1976), about her mother, and "Intercultural Reminiscences" (1997), an autobiography.

Later years 
In her retirement, Cheng continued her advocacy for educational opportunities, founding the Chung Hwa School, which taught Chinese culture, in San Diego in 1970. She also taught at the University of California, San Diego, in this period, as well as teaching citizenship and other classes for immigrants to the United States.

She died in 2007 at age 102.

References 

1904 births
2007 deaths
Hong Kong educators
Hong Kong civil servants
Teachers College, Columbia University alumni
Ho family
Women in Hong Kong
Hong Kong people of Dutch-Jewish descent
Hong Kong emigrants to the United States
Educational administrators
Hong Kong centenarians
Women centenarians